Roger Links (born 4 October 1963) is a retired South African football (soccer) defender who played for Battswood FC, Cape Town Spurs.

References

1963 births
Living people
South African soccer players
South Africa international soccer players
White South African people
Association football defenders
Cape Town Spurs F.C. players